Red Rising is a 2014 dystopian science fiction novel by American author Pierce Brown, and the first book and eponym of a series. The novel, set in the future on Mars, follows lowborn miner Darrow as he infiltrates the ranks of the elite Golds.

Red Rising has received generally positive reviews. In 2014, Universal Pictures secured the rights for a film adaptation, but the project was eventually scrapped. Brown began developing Red Rising as a television series in 2018, and later announced that the potential series had a director and a showrunner with either Netflix, Apple TV+, Disney+, Amazon Prime or HBO interested in adapting the series as of September 2021.  A six-issue prequel comic book series, Red Rising: Sons of Ares, was published in 2017.

Plot summary
It has been seven hundred years since mankind colonized other planets. The powerful ruling class of humans has installed a rigid, color-based social hierarchy where the physically superior Golds at the top rule with an iron fist. Sixteen-year-old Darrow is a Red, a class of workers who toil beneath the surface of Mars mining helium-3 to terraform the planet. He and his wife Eo are captured after entering a forbidden area and are arrested. While Eo is publicly whipped for her crime she sings a forbidden folk song as a protest against the Reds enslavement. She is subsequently hanged on the orders of the Mars' Arch-Governor. Darrow cuts down and buries his wife's body, a crime for which he is also hanged. However, Darrow awakes to find that he has been drugged and delivered into the hands of the Sons of Ares, a group of Red and others who fight against the oppression of the "low Colors". Ares have adopted the video of Eo's song and execution as a rallying vehicle for their cause.

Darrow is given the chance to infiltrate the Society to bring it down from within. He is physically transformed by Mickey, a Violet "carver", who gives him the abilities and appearance of a Gold. Using a fabricated identity Darrow is accepted into the Golds' elite Institute, where he befriends Cassius au Bellona and alienates the arrogant Antonia au Severus. Darrow is selected for House Mars by Fitchner. To continue to the next stage, Darrow must complete the Passage, a test in which the 100 newly chosen students in each of the twelve Houses are paired with another house member and tasked to kill each other as a means to eliminate the weaker half. Darrow is forced to murder Cassius' brother Julian to survive, but Cassius can only guess who may have killed him.

Each House is assigned a fortress and a scepter, called a standard, to defend within the Institute's confines, with the goal of warring with each other until one House enslaves all others with the standard. Mars fractures into factions: one led jointly by Darrow and Cassius, one by Antonia, one by Titus au Ladros, and the antisocial Sevro going off on his own. To neutralize the violent Titus, who has been raping the female slaves left in Mars' fortress, Darrow manipulates House Minerva, led by the young woman he met briefly upon his arrival at the Institute and whom he has dubbed "Mustang". Mustang and her troops take the Mars fortress and imprison Titus. Sevro helps Darrow escape and capture Minerva's standard, which he trades to reclaim Mars' castle. Darrow takes over as the Primus (leader) of Mars, and Sevro and his group of "Howlers" declare their loyalty to him. Darrow realizes from the captive Titus' manner of speech that he is a fellow Red impersonating a Gold. To maintain his cover, Darrow allows Titus to be executed. Darrow captures Minerva's fortress and defeats their strongman Pax au Telemanus. Mustang reveals the existence of "the Jackal", the leader of House Pluto who is terrorizing other Houses. Antonia and some of Titus' former followers attempt to overthrow Darrow, but he manages to thwart their plan. Lilath, a messenger from the Jackal, secretly reveals to Cassius that Darrow killed Julian. Cassius challenges Darrow to a duel outside Mars' fortress, wounding him and leaving him to die.

Darrow is rescued and nursed back to health by Mustang. They begin to develop romantic feelings for each other as they flee to avoid discovery by Cassius, now Primus of House Mars. Conquered students are systematically "enslaved" by other Houses, forced by their honor to serve their conquerors. Darrow and Mustang begin to amass an army by recruiting many Oathbreakers, the wandering slaves who have chosen to disobey orders, with Minerva's standard. Darrow prefers that his captured foes swear their allegiance and join him, rather than serve him. Learning from his previous mistakes, he frees these slaves and takes responsibility for their actions to gain their allegiance. He gains the loyalty of the duplicitous Tactus au Rath when he accepts physical punishment on himself after administering the same to Tactus for unruly behavior. Sevro, who has led his team of Howlers to escape from Cassius and has now lost an eye, meets up with Darrow again to join forces. Darrow takes the fortresses of Houses Ceres, Apollo, and Jupiter, enslaving their members until the prisoners prove their loyalty to him. Fitchner reveals to Darrow that the other Proctors have been conspiring to assist the Jackal, who is actually Adrius, the son of ArchGovernor Augustus. Darrow exposes a prisoner taken during the surrender of house Jupiter as the Jackal after impaling his hand and offering him the opportunity to free himself by cutting it off. The Jackal slices off his own hand to escape and uses Darrow's shock as an opening, attacking him and killing Pax in the attempt; then escaping with the assistance of Proctor Apollo.

Enraged by the Proctors' deliberate efforts to hinder his victory, Darrow slays Proctor Apollo, and his army storms Mount Olympus, the floating palace of the Proctors using the flying boots gained from proctor Apollo. With the remaining Proctors subdued with the help of Sevro and the Howlers, Darrow sends Mustang to capture the Jackal, only to find out from Fitchner that she is Virginia au Augustus, the Jackal's twin sister. Darrow expects a betrayal, but she returns to deliver her captive brother, and Darrow wins the exercise. Before he departs, Cassius promises Darrow revenge. With his victory, Darrow is given his choice of a patron to sponsor his future. He accepts the hated ArchGovernor Augustus' offer to serve as one of his lancers, knowing that the powerful man will offer him the greatest opportunities to acquire the power he needs to destroy the Golds.

Characters
 Darrow, a Red who is remade into a Gold named "Darrow au Andromedus" to infiltrate and destroy the Society. He is later called "The Reaper" by his classmates, for the sickle-shaped blade he carries as his weapon.
 Eo, Darrow's wife whose hanging for treason ignites his desire for revenge against the Golds.
 Nero au Augustus, the ArchGovernor of Mars who orders Eo's execution.
 Virginia au Augustus, daughter of the ArchGovernor and leader of House Minerva at the Institute. Initially not knowing her given name, Darrow calls her "Mustang".
 Adrius au Augustus, Virginia's vicious twin brother, leader of House Pluto at the Institute. His cruel and violent tactics of conquest earn him the nickname "The Jackal".
 Cassius au Bellona, Darrow's ally and friend in House Mars.
 Roque, Darrow's friend and ally in House Mars, a self-styled poet.
 Sevro, Darrow's friend and ally in House Mars, a lowDraft with an antisocial attitude.
 Antonia au Severus, a ruthless Gold whom Darrow alienates almost immediately.
 Titus au Ladros, a violent and tyrannical member of House Mars.
 Pax au Telemanus, a massive warrior aligned with Virginia in House Minerva.
 Tactus au Rath, a duplicitous member of House Diana.
 Fitchner, Proctor of Mars at the Institute, Sevro's father.
 Narol, Darrow's paternal uncle, rescues Darrow after his execution and sends him to the Sons of Ares.
 Dancer, Darrow's mentor in the Sons of Ares who first reveals to him the lies of the Golds.
 Harmony, Dancer's half-disfigured, female partner and Darrow's contentious drill instructor. 
 Mickey, a Violet Carver who remakes Darrow's body and physically transforms him into a Gold.
 Matteo, a Pink who educates Darrow about the society, its history, politics and arts.
 Octavia au Lune, the Sovereign of the Society.
 Evey, a winged-Pink who nurses and cares for Darrow during The Carving.

Development
Brown said of writing Red Rising, "I started with the main character [Darrow] and shaped my world around him. I was inspired by the plight of Irish immigrants in the 19th century and by the disenfranchisement of working classes." Brown also explained:

Reception
Red Rising was well received by both readers and critics, and hit #20 on The New York Times Best Seller list in February 2014.

Marc Snetiker of Entertainment Weekly gave the book an A−, writing, "Brown writes with cinematic grandeur, cleverly fusing Roman mythology with science fiction and pacing his action scenes for a slow-burn build to a hold-your-breath final act." Brian Truitt of USA Today gave the book 3.5 out of 4 stars, proclaiming, "Red Rising ascends above a crowded dystopian field." Writing for The Huffington Post, Britt Michaelian explained, "The morals and values that are explored through the characters in Red Rising have the potential to inspire a generation of readers to think intelligently about the impact of their decisions on themselves, their family and friends and on their world as a whole. This book is truly a powerful lesson in leadership." Niall Alexander wrote for Tor.com:

Kirkus Reviews described the novel as "reminiscent of The Hunger Games and Game of Thrones, calling it "a fine novel for those who like to immerse themselves in alternative worlds". However, Publishers Weekly said of the novel, "Pierce offers a Hollywood-ready story with plenty of action and thrills but painfully little originality or plausibility."

Brown's Red Rising fans have dubbed themselves "Howlers" after characters in the novels, and the author has also noted the popularity of his novels among outsiders, saying "It's amazing that they have found a home in these books ... All these lost souls in my books have connected with people and I find it incredibly moving."

Prequel comic

A six-issue prequel comic book series exploring the origins of the rebel group "Sons of Ares" called Red Rising: Sons of Ares was published by Dynamite Entertainment in 2017. The series was continued with six more issues published in 2020.

Board game
In February 2021, Stonemaier Games announced their Red Rising board game. The game got a Recommendation by the International Gamers Awards 2021.

References

External links
 

2014 American novels
2014 debut novels
2014 science fiction novels
American adventure novels
American science fiction novels
Debut science fiction novels
Dystopian novels
Classical mythology in popular culture
Novels about slavery
Novels by Pierce Brown
Novels set on Mars
Science fantasy novels
Works about women in war
Del Rey books